Linsky is a surname. Notable people with the surname include:

 David Linsky (born 1957), American lawyer and politician
 Freddie Linsky
 Jeff Linsky (born 1952), American jazz guitarist
 Leonard Linsky (1922–2012), American philosopher
 Ronald B. Linsky (1934–2005), American oceanographer